Deliverance is the second full-length studio album from American rock band Quietdrive, released on October 14, 2008 through The Militia Group.

Track listing
All songs written by Kevin Truckenmiller.
"Believe" - 3:32
"Deliverance" - 3:22
"Daddy's Little Girl" - 3:43
"Motivation" - 2:50
"Birthday" - 3:14
"Afterall" - 2:59
"Pretend" - 3:09
"Hollywood" - 2:56
"Kissing Your Lips" - 2:58
"Take Me Now" - 3:59
"Promise Me" - 3:13
"Secret" - 4:18
"Starbright" - 4:28

References

2008 albums
Quietdrive albums
The Militia Group albums